The 1962 Nobel Prize in Literature was awarded to the American author John Steinbeck (1902–1968) "for his realistic and imaginative writings, combining as they do sympathetic humour and keen social perception."

Laureate

Social conditions of migrants and seasonal workers became a recurring theme in Steinbeck's writings and were particularly evident in Of Mice and Men (1937) and The Grapes of Wrath (1939). The latter relates how unemployment and abuse of power forced farmers to migrate from Oklahoma to California. Sympathy with the downtrodden and the poor characterizes his writing. It is expressed with a compassionate sense of humor and a sharp eye for social and economic injustices. His other outstanding works include East of Eden (1952), Tortilla Flat (1935) and The Pearl (1947).

Deliberations

Nominations
Steinbeck was nominated for the Nobel Prize in Literature on 11 occasions, the first time in 1943. In 1962, the Nobel committee received two nominations for him. Included in the shortlisted nominees were Steinbeck, Robert Graves, Lawrence Durrell, Jean Anouilh, and Karen Blixen. Steinbeck was awarded eventually, but the four never received the prize.

In total, the Swedish Academy received 86 nominations for 66 individuals. 15 of the nominees were nominated first-time, among them William Heinesen, Pietro Ubaldi, Ronald Syme, Carl Zuckmayer, André Schwarz-Bart, Josep Carner and Eyvind Johnson (awarded in 1974). British novelist E. M. Forster earned the highest number of nominations (4 nominations) followed by Jean-Paul Sartre and Friedrich Dürrenmatt (3 nominations each). Three of the nominees were women namely Karen Blixen, Gertrud von le Fort and Giulia Scappino Mureno.

The authors Antonio Acevedo Hernández, Gerrit Achterberg, Richard Aldington, Jean Amrouche, Georges Bataille, Pierre Benoit, E. E. Cummings, Maria Dermoût, Jean Devanny, Mouloud Feraoun, Wilfrid Wilson Gibson, Mary Gilmore, Patrick Hamilton, Pierre Hamp, Agnes Henningsen, Robinson Jeffers, Helge Krog, Alda Lara, María Rosa Lida de Malkiel, Arthur Oncken Lovejoy, Francisco Méndez, Patrícia Rehder Galvão (known as Pagu), Vita Sackville-West, Hajime Tanabe, Ahmet Hamdi Tanpınar, Sandu Tudor, Mohammad Yamin, and Ouyang Yuqian died in 1962 without having been nominated for the prize. Danish author Karen Blixen and German translator Rudolf Alexander Schröder died weeks before the announcement.

Prize Decision
In 2012 (50 years later), the Nobel Prize opened its archives and it was revealed that Steinbeck was a "compromise choice" among a shortlist consisting of Steinbeck, British authors Robert Graves and Lawrence Durrell, French dramatist Jean Anouilh and Danish author Karen Blixen. The declassified documents showed that he was chosen as the best of a bad lot: "There aren't any obvious candidates for the Nobel prize and the prize committee is in an unenviable situation," wrote committee member Henry Olsson. Although the committee believed Steinbeck's best work was behind him by 1962, committee member Anders Österling believed the release of his novel The Winter of Our Discontent showed that "after some signs of slowing down in recent years, [Steinbeck has] regained his position as a social truth-teller [and is an] authentic realist fully equal to his predecessors Sinclair Lewis and Ernest Hemingway."  

In 2010, Swedish Academy's archives later revealed that Danish writer Karen Blixen was a favorite candidate since 1959 but was missed out because the committee were concerned about showing favoritism to Scandinavian writers. "The Nobel academy was probably afraid to appear provincial," Johannes Riis, literary director at Gyldendals publishing house told Politiken. "And so a mistake was made, because obviously Karen Blixen ought to have received the Nobel prize. Instead, it was a kind of reverse provincialism." Blixen eventually died in September 7, 1962, making her ineligible further for the prize.

Reactions
The selection of Steinbeck was heavily criticized, and described as "one of the Academy's biggest mistakes" in one Swedish newspaper. While there were some positive reactions in America, The New York Times asked why the Nobel committee gave the award to an author whose "limited talent is, in his best books, watered down by tenth-rate philosophising", adding, "we think it interesting that the laurel was not awarded to a writer ... whose significance, influence and sheer body of work had already made a more profound impression on the literature of our age". Steinbeck himself, when asked if he deserved the Nobel on the day of the announcement, replied: "Frankly, no."  Today, however, many of Steinbecks works are widely read and considered classics of Western literature.

References

External links
Prize presentation nobelprize.org
The Nobel Prize Award Ceremony 1962 - NobelPrize.org

1962
John Steinbeck